In baseball, earned run average (ERA) is a statistic used to evaluate pitchers, calculated as the mean of earned runs given up by a pitcher per nine innings pitched. A pitcher is assessed an earned run for each run scored by a baserunner who reached base while batting against that pitcher, whether by hit, base on balls or "walk", or being hit by a pitched ball; an earned run can be charged after the pitcher is relieved if he allows the runner before leaving the game. Runs scored by players who reach base on errors, passed balls, or catcher interference under special circumstances are treated as unearned runs, and do not count towards the pitcher's ERA.

Major League Baseball recognizes the player in each league with the lowest earned run average each season. The first ERA champion in the National League was George Bradley; in the National League's inaugural 1876 season, Bradley posted a 1.23 ERA for the St. Louis Brown Stockings, allowing 78 earned runs in 573 innings pitched. The American League was established in 1901, and Hall of Fame pitcher Cy Young led that league with a 1.62 ERA for the Boston Americans during the 1901 season.

Over the course of his 17-year major league career, Lefty Grove led the American League in ERA nine times, with a career single-season low of 2.06 for the 1931 Philadelphia Athletics. Roger Clemens has won the second-most ERA titles, capturing six in the American League and one in the National League. Sandy Koufax led the National League in ERA for five consecutive seasons (1962–1966); Koufax' five awards are the most won consecutively by any player and are tied for the most awards by a player in the National League with Christy Mathewson and Clayton Kershaw. In the American League, Walter Johnson also won five ERA titles, and Pedro Martínez has won a total of five (four American League and one National League) with two different teams.

The most recent ERA champions are Justin Verlander in the American League and Julio Urías in the National League.

The lowest single-season ERA in league history was posted by Tim Keefe, whose 0.86 ERA in 105 innings pitched for the National League's Troy Trojans in 1880 led his closest competitor by .52 runs. In the American League, Dutch Leonard's 0.96 ERA is a single-season record. Keefe and Leonard are the only two pitchers ever to allow less than one run per nine innings pitched in a single season. The widest margin of victory for an ERA champion is 1.96 runs, achieved when Martínez' 1.74 ERA led Clemens' 3.70 in the American League during the 2000 season. The largest margin of victory in the National League is 1.26 runs—Dazzy Vance's 2.61 ERA over Carl Hubbell's 3.87 in 1930. The smallest margin of victory for an ERA champion is .009 runs. Although the statistic is traditionally recorded to two decimal places by most  the 1988 American League title was decided by a margin of less than one hundredth of a run when Allan Anderson's ERA of 2.446 (55 earned runs in  innings) bested Teddy Higuera's 2.455 mark (62 earned runs in  innings). Other contests decided by one hundredth or less include Luis Tiant's 1.91 ERA ahead of Gaylord Perry's 1.92 in 1972 and Mark Fidrych (2.34) over Vida Blue (2.35) in 1976.

Key

National League

Notes
 While Baseball-Reference.com lists both Niekro and Joaquín Andújar with an ERA of 2.47 in 1982, Niekro's average is lower (2.467) than Andújar's (2.473) if extended to three decimal places.

American League

Notes
 While Baseball-Reference.com lists both Scarborough and Hall of Famer Bob Lemon with an ERA of 2.82 in 1948, Scarborough's average is lower (2.817) than Lemon's (2.820) if extended to three decimal places.
 While Baseball-Reference lists both Anderson and Higuera with an ERA of 2.45 in 1988, Anderson's average is lower (2.446) than Higuera's (2.455) if extended to three decimal places.
 Until 1981, the rules stated that the number of innings pitched should be rounded to the nearest whole inning.  This explains why McCatty was, at the time, awarded the 1981 ERA title although his ERA appears to be slightly higher than that of Stewart.

Footnotes

 This is shown in the mathematical formula at right.
Recognized "major leagues" include the current American and National Leagues and several defunct leagues—the American Association, the Federal League, the Players' League, and the Union Association.
 A pitcher must average throwing at least one inning per game scheduled for his team during the season (currently 162 innings per 162 games) to qualify for the ERA title.

See also

Adjusted ERA+
Defense-Independent ERA
List of Major League Baseball leaders in career ERA
Run average

References
General

Inline citations

ERA champions